USS Des Moines (CA-134) was the lead ship of the class of United States Navy heavy cruisers. She was the first ship in the United States Navy to feature the auto loading Mark 16 8-inch/55 caliber gun, the first of its type in the world. She was the second ship of the US Navy to be commissioned with the name of the capitol of Iowa, Des Moines.

Construction and career 

Des Moines was launched 27 September 1946 by Bethlehem Steel Company, Fore River Shipyard, Quincy, Massachusetts; sponsored by Mrs. E. T. Meredith, Jr.; and commissioned 16 November 1948.  She became the first of her class to mount the semi-automatic Mark 16 8-inch turrets and carry the new Sikorsky HO3S-1 utility helicopters in place of seaplanes. She was named after the capital of the state of Iowa.

In a varied operating schedule designed to maintain the readiness of the Navy to meet the constant demands of defense and foreign policy, Des Moines cruised from her home port at Newport, Rhode Island and after 1950, from Norfolk, Virginia on exercises of every type in the Caribbean, along the East Coast, in the Mediterranean Sea, and in North Atlantic waters. Annually between 1949 and 1957 she deployed to the Mediterranean, during the first seven years serving as flagship for the 6th Task Fleet (known as the 6th Fleet from 1950). In 1952, and each year from 1954 to 1957, she carried midshipmen for summer training cruises, crossing to Northern European ports on the first four cruises. She also sailed to Northern Europe on NATO exercises in 1952, 1953, and 1955. On 18 February 1958, she cleared Norfolk for the Mediterranean once more, this time to remain as flagship for the 6th Fleet until July 1961 when she was placed out of commission in reserve.

Through her Mediterranean services Des Moines contributed significantly to the success of the 6th Fleet in representing American power and interests in the countries of Southern Europe, Northern Africa, and the Near East. She made this contribution through such activities as her participation in NATO Mediterranean exercises; her call to seldom-visited Rijeka, Yugoslavia, in December 1950 and Dubrovnik, Yugoslavia, in May 1960, and to many other ports as a regular feature of her schedule; her cruising in the eastern Atlantic during the wake of the Suez Crisis of 1956; and service on patrol and as control center for American forces in the Lebanon crisis of 1958.

Film footage of her cruising with other ships of the United States 6th Fleet was used in the introduction and conclusion of the movie John Paul Jones, starring Robert Stack (Warner Brothers 1959).

Decommissioning 
After decommissioning in 1961 she was mothballed in the South Boston Naval Annex and eventually laid up in the Naval Inactive Ship Maintenance Facility at Philadelphia in maintained reserve.  In 1981 the United States Congress directed that the Navy conduct a survey to determine if she and sister ship  could be reactivated (in lieu of two ) to support the 600-ship Navy proposed by the Reagan Administration.  The study concluded that while both ships would be useful in the active fleet, there was not enough deck space to add the modern weapons systems (Tomahawk cruise missiles, Harpoon anti-ship missiles, Phalanx CIWS mounts, radars and communication systems) that the ships would need to operate in a 1980s environment.  In addition, the per-ship costs for the reactivation and updates (that were determined feasible) would be close to the costs for an Iowa, for a much less capable ship.  Therefore, both ships remained in maintained reserve until they were struck off the reserve list in August 1993.

After an attempt to turn her into a museum ship in Milwaukee, Wisconsin failed, she was sold in 2005, and then towed to Brownsville, Texas, for scrapping. By July 2007, she had been completely broken up. Her status officially changed to "disposed of by scrapping, dismantling" on 16 August 2007. Two of her dual 5-inch/38 gun mounts were donated to the  museum in Corpus Christi, Texas, where they can now be seen on display.

Her sister ship  was scrapped in New Orleans in 1993.  The third Des Moines-class ship, is a museum ship in Quincy, Massachusetts.

USS Des Moines ' bell, nameplate and plaque are on display at Camp Dodge, Johnston, Iowa. The USS Des Moines ' port anchor resides in the roundabout at the entrance to Quincy, Massachusetts, which is adjacent to the USS Salem Museum.

Gallery

Awards
Navy Occupation Medal with (Asia and Europe clasps)
National Defense Service Medal 
Armed Forces Expeditionary Medal

References

External links 

 NavSource photos of Des Moines
 ex-Des Moines being scrapped in Brownsville, Texas, January 2007
 Google Map picture of the Des Moines in Brownsville
 USS Des Moines – Reunion Allumni Association, official web site
 World of Warships article
 

1946 ships
Cold War cruisers of the United States
Des Moines-class cruisers
Ships built in Quincy, Massachusetts